This table shows a comparison of notable and available ORM software products.

See also 
 List of object–relational mapping software
 Object–relational mapping

References

External links 
 ormeter.net .NET LINQ ORM Comparison – Updated 30 July 2010

Object-relational mapping
Object-relational mapping